Dhani Miran is a small village of Tosham Tehsil, Bhiwani District, Haryana. The village is 45 km from its district capital, and is situated on Tosham Siwani road.

See also
 List of villages in Bhiwani district

References 

Villages in Bhiwani district